Nimadi is a Western Indo-Aryan language spoken in the Nimar region of west-central India within the state of Madhya Pradesh. This region lies adjacent to Maharashtra and south of Malwa. The districts where Nimadi is spoken are: Barwani, Khandwa, Barwaha, Khargone, Burhanpur, Bedia, Sanawad and parts of Dhar, Harda and South Dewas districts. The famous writers of Nimari were Gaurishankar Sharma, Ramnarayan Upadhyay etc.

Nimari is mainly spoken in Khargone, Barwani and Khandwa districts. Ramnarayan Upadhyay, Mahadeo Prasad Chaturvedi, Prabhakar Ji Dubey, Jeevan Joshi, and others worked in it. "Ammar Bol " (Translation of Bhagwat Geeta) composed by Mahadeo Prasad Chaturvedi "Madhya" is the first epic in Nimari. Prabhakar Ji Dubey was also awarded by the president of India. He lived in a town named Barwaha which is situated near Maheshwar and Omkasreshwar(One of the jyotirlinga). He played many stage dramas. He was a disciple of Rama Dada and often used to visit Khandwa. He is still famous for songs like "Gammat, Swang". He also worked as a professional teacher. His one of the book named "Thumka" was also awarded by Academy of Isuri. He died on 13 March 1997.

References

Hindi languages
Languages of Madhya Pradesh